Anchomomys' milleri is an extinct primate related to lemuriforms that lived in Africa during the early late Eocene. It was originally thought to be a member of the European genus Anchomomys, but was later aligned with the djebelemurids, although a new generic name needs to be assigned.

References 

Prehistoric strepsirrhines
Eocene primates
Fossil taxa described in 1997
Eocene mammals of Africa